The 1906–07 Nemzeti Bajnokság I was contested by 8 teams, and Ferencvárosi TC won the championship.

League standings

Results

References
Hungary - List of final tables (RSSSF)

1906-07
1906–07 in Hungarian football
1906–07 in European association football leagues